Arch is a public art work by artist Ernest Carl Shaw located at the Lynden Sculpture Garden near Milwaukee, Wisconsin. The sculpture is an abstract form made of four steel bars arranged in a trapezoid; it is rust-colored and installed on the lawn.

See also
 Epicenter
 Epicenter II
 III Columns

References

Sculptures in Wisconsin
Outdoor sculptures in Milwaukee
Outdoor sculptures in Wisconsin
1976 sculptures
Steel sculptures in Wisconsin
Abstract sculptures in Wisconsin
1976 establishments in Wisconsin